Jill Polley is an English international female lawn and indoor bowler.

Bowls career
She won a triples silver medal at the 2000 World Outdoor Bowls Championship in Johannesburg, South Africa and was the 1993 National triples champion at the National Championships.

Polley is the Secretary of the Essex County Bowling Association.

References

Living people
English female bowls players
Year of birth missing (living people)